Rocca is an Italian surname. Notable people with the surname include:

 Agostino Rocca, founder of Techint
 Américo Rocca,  Mexican Luchador, or professional wrestler
 Andrea Rocca, Italian musician and film composer
 Angelo Rocca, Italian humanist, librarian and bishop
 Anthony Rocca, Australian rules footballer
 Antonino Rocca, Argentinian professional wrestler
 Antonio Rocca, Italian painter
 Christina B. Rocca, United States Assistant Secretary of State for South and Central Asian Affairs
 Costantino Rocca, Italian golfer
 Daniela Rocca, Italian actress, model and writer
 Enrico Rocca, Italian violin maker of the 19th and the 20th Centuries
 Francesco Rocca, Italian professional football coach and former player
 Giacomo Rocca (or Giacomo della Rocca), Italian painter
 Gianfelice Rocca, Italian businessman, Techint
 Gianni Rocca (1929–2013), Italian sprinter
 Giorgio Rocca, Italian alpine skier

 Giuseppe Rocca, Italian violin maker of the 19th century
 Iacopo La Rocca, Italian-Australian footballer
 Ketty La Rocca, Italian artist during the 1960s and 70s
 Lodovico Rocca (1895–1986), Italian composer
 Maria Laura Rocca, Italian actress and writer
 Mason Rocca, American born Italian professional basketball player
 Michelle Rocca, presenter of the Eurovision Song Contest 1988
 Mo Rocca, American writer, comedian, and political satirist
 Nick LaRocca, Sicilian-American jazz musician
 Paolo Rocca, president of Techint
 Peter Rocca, American backstroke swimmer
 Sal Rocca, Italian-American member of the Michigan House of Representatives
 Saverio Rocca, Australian American football punter
 Silvia Rocca, Italian ski mountaineer
 Stefania Rocca, Italian actress
 Tory Rocca, member of the Michigan Senate

Italian-language surnames